Charles Edward Howlett (26 September 1906 – 1990) was an English footballer who played as a centre forward for Durham City,  Rochdale and Halifax Town.

References

Durham City A.F.C. players
Rochdale A.F.C. players
Halifax Town A.F.C. players
Spennymoor Town F.C. players
Annfield Plain F.C. players
Shildon A.F.C. players
English footballers
Association football forwards
People from Shildon
Footballers from County Durham
1906 births
1990 deaths